The Bishari (or ,;) are an ethnic group who live in parts of Northeast Africa. They are one of the major divisions of the Beja people. Apart from local dialects of Arabic, the Bishari speak the Beja language, which belongs to the Afroasiatic family.

Demographics
The Bishari live in the eastern part of the Nubian Desert in Sudan and southern Egypt. They reside in the Atabai (also spelled Atbai) area between the Nile River and the Red Sea, north of the Amarar and south of the Ababda people between the Nubian desert and the Nile valley, an area of limestone, mountains, with sandstone plateaus.

The Bishari population numbers around 42,000 individuals. Most people of the tribe move within the territory of Sudan, where members have political representation in the Beja Congress.

Language
The Bishari speak the Beja language as a mother tongue. It belongs to the Cushitic branch of the Afroasiatic family.

The Beja inhabiting Sudan also speak Sudanese Arabic as a second language. In 1949, a member of the Bishari tribe stated that when they meet a stranger, they immediately ask "'Are you biggaweijet (=Bišari) or belaeijt (Arab)?'" and continued "‘...We call our language biggawija and it contains many elements of Arabic (belaeijet).'"

Economy
The Bishari are traditionally nomadic people, working in husbandry of camels, sheep, and goats in the southern part of the Eastern Desert. This area is largely unexplored. Of all the tribes in the area, they live in the more remote areas. The Bishari and the Bishari Qamhatab, believed to be ancient Bishari, have traded agricultural commodities with other people since ancient times.

Religion
The Bishari are mostly Sunni Muslims. In the 10th century CE, the Muslim geographer Al-Maqdisi wrote that the Bishari were Christians. Throughout their history, the Bishari tribes have practised numerous different religions, including varieties of paganism, then Christianity and now Islam. Although they are recognised as Muslims, Islam is not deep rooted in the culture. Often of equal importance are traditional beliefs. Many continue to fear the influence of jinn, or bad spirits, which they believe are all around and cause sickness and disputes between neighbours.

See also
 Amarar 
 Hadendoa
 Beni-Amer people

References

Further reading
Egypt: Handbook for Travellers : Part First, Lower Egypt, with the Fayum and the Peninsula of Sinai, by Karl Baedeker, (1885)

Bedouin groups
Ethnic groups in Sudan
Ethnic groups in Egypt
Cushitic-speaking peoples
African nomads
Modern nomads
Beja people